The Quinn River, once known as the Queen River, is an intermittent river, approximately  long, in the desert of northwestern Nevada in the United States. It drains an enclosed basin inside the larger Great Basin.

It rises in northeastern Humboldt County, on the west side of the Santa Rosa Range, just south of the Oregon state line. Its course flows southwest, through the main Nevada lands of the Fort McDermitt Paiute and Shoshone Tribes and then south and southwest, receiving the Kings River flowing south from Kings River Valley.

Catchment 
The Quinn River is the largest river in the region, starting in the Santa Rosa Range and ending in the Quinn River Sink on the playa south of the Black Rock Range. The watershed covers  including the Upper and Lower Quinn River, Smoke Creek Desert, Massacre Lake, and Thousand Creek/Virgin Valley watersheds of northwestern Nevada as well as small parts across the borders of California and Oregon.

Quinn River Sink

See also
 List of rivers of the Great Basin

References 

Rivers of Nevada
Rivers of Humboldt County, Nevada
Rivers of Malheur County, Oregon
Rivers of the Great Basin